Patricia Pérez Peña (born 17 December 1978 in Guadalajara, Jalisco) is a Mexican former footballer who played for the Mexico women's national football team. She competed for her native country at the 2004 Summer Olympics in Athens, Greece, where the team finished in eighth place.

References

 
 Profile at sports-reference

1978 births
Living people
Women's association football midfielders
Mexican women's footballers
Footballers from Guadalajara, Jalisco
Mexico women's international footballers
1999 FIFA Women's World Cup players
Olympic footballers of Mexico
Footballers at the 2004 Summer Olympics
Primera División (women) players
FC Barcelona Femení players
Mexican expatriate women's footballers
Mexican expatriate sportspeople in Spain
Expatriate women's footballers in Spain
Footballers at the 2003 Pan American Games
Pan American Games bronze medalists for Mexico
Medalists at the 2003 Pan American Games
Pan American Games medalists in football
Mexican footballers